Smelt Pond is a  pond in Kingston, Massachusetts. The pond is located west of the Kingston Collection and north of U.S. Route 44. Camp Nekon, a  former Girl Scout camp which closed in 1975 and has since become a recreation area, surrounds the pond. The water quality is impaired due to non-native aquatic plants and non-native fish in the pond.

External links
Environmental Protection Agency
South Shore Coastal Watersheds - Lake Assessments

Ponds of Plymouth County, Massachusetts
Ponds of Massachusetts